Jürgen Freiwald (9 September 1940 – 2014) was a German volleyball player who competed in the men's tournament at the 1968 Summer Olympics.

References

External links
 

1940 births
2014 deaths
German men's volleyball players
Olympic volleyball players of East Germany
Volleyball players at the 1968 Summer Olympics
People from Husum
Sportspeople from Schleswig-Holstein
20th-century German people